Beynon may refer to:

places:
Beynon, Alberta, Canada

people with the surname Beynon:

Ben Beynon (1894-1969), Welsh international rugby player and professional football player
Bill Beynon (1891-1932), British and Empire bantamweight champion boxer 
David Beynon, rugby league footballer of the 1900s for Wales, and Oldham
Granville Beynon (1914-1996), Welsh physicist
Kate Beynon, Australian artist
 John Beynon, pseudonym of John Wyndham, (1903-1969) science fiction writer
Sir John Beynon, 1st Baronet (1864-1944), Welsh steel and coal owner
Thomas Beynon (disambiguation)
William Beynon (1888-1958), Tsimshian historian and translator
William Addison Beynon, (1877-1968), Canadian politician

English-language surnames
Surnames of Welsh origin